TMK Air Commuter was a regional airline based in Goma, Democratic Republic of the Congo. Its main base is Goma International Airport. The airline suspended operations as of 31 August 2011.

Destinations
Democratic Republic of the Congo
Beni - Beni Airport
Bunia - Bunia Airport
Butembo - Butembo Airport
Goma - Goma International Airport Base
Uganda
Entebbe - Entebbe International Airport

Fleet
The TMK Air Commuter fleet includes the following aircraft:

See also		
 Transport in the Democratic Republic of the Congo

References

External links

Defunct airlines of the Democratic Republic of the Congo
Goma